The 1992 Kentucky Derby was the 118th running of the Kentucky Derby. The race took place on May 2, 1992. There were 132,543 in attendance. The eighth-place finish of odds-on favorite Arazi was the worst finish of an odds-on betting favorite in Derby history.

Payout
The 118th Kentucky Derby Payout Schedule

 $2 Exacta: (7-3)  Paid   $854.40

Full results

References

1992
Kentucky Derby
Derby
Kentucky
Kentucky Derby